Hugo Rüter (7 September 1859 – 25 December 1949) was a German composer.

Born in Hamburg, he studied at the Conservatory of his hometown and later settled down in Wandsbek as director of choral societies, being appointed in 1897 as a teacher of Matthias-Claudius-Gymnasium. He died in Mieste.

His father Christian was a foreman in a sailmaker's shop at the port. He had come into contact with music from early childhood through the nearby Michaeliskirche. The family later moved to Wandsbek, where Hugo attended school. Then Rüter went to the middle school at the Lärmberg. After confirmation in 1873, he left school and, on the advice of his teacher Scheibler, began training for the teaching profession. At the age of 15, he got a job as a preparatory at the Protestant church school in the neighbouring town of Hamm. At the age of 15 he learned to play the piano, but his talent was singing. At the age of 17 he passed the entrance exam at the Bernuthsche Konservatorium in Hamburg-Hamm. There he studied from 1876 to 1882 with Carl Georg Peter Graedener, Hugo Riemann, Karl F. Armbrust, Carl Louis Bargheer and Heinrich Degenhardt. In 1880 he wrote his 1st symphony in C sharp minor. Hugo Rüter's work is quite extensive.

Rüter lived in Hamburg-Hamm on the 2nd floor of the house at Kampstraße 84, which was renamed "Rüterstraße" in his honor in 1951.

Works
Kaiser-Ouverture, with the choir of men
Three operas: Frau Inge, Eulenspiegel, Die Schildbürger
Incidental music for three tragedies by Sophocles King Oedipus, Antigone, Phyloctetes
Incidental music for one tragedy by Euripides Alkestis
Seven symphonies
Violin concerto
Sextet for two violins, two violas and two cellos
Seven quintets for strings and woodwinds
Six string quartets
Five trios
Three canonical suites for violin and viola
20 sonatas for violin and piano
12 sonatas for viola and piano
Three sonatinas for violin and viola
Three sonatas for flute and piano
Two romances for violin and piano
Duets for violin and guitar
Sonata for clarinet and piano
Sonata for horn and piano
Two sonatinas for piano four hands and cello
Pieces for piano, including 12 sonatas, three sonatas for piano four hands and three sonatinas
Organ works
Choral music
Lieder
Piano school

References

 Enciclopèdia Espasa. Volume 52, p. 988 
 Gitarre aktuell. No. 2/2015, Hamburg, p. 37

External links
Biography

German male classical composers
German opera composers
Male opera composers
German Romantic composers
19th-century German composers
20th-century German composers
1859 births
1949 deaths
20th-century German male musicians
19th-century German male musicians